Wildlife is the third full-length studio album by the indie rock band Headlights. It was released by the Polyvinyl Record Co. on October 6, 2009.

Track listing
1. Telephones - 4:09

2. Secrets - 3:24

3. You and Eye - 3:42

4. Get Going - 2:39

5. Love Song for Buddy - 3:15

6. I Don't Mind at All - 3:48

7. Dead Ends - 3:49

8. Wisconsin Beaches - 3:19

9. We're All Animals - 5:06

10. Teenage Wonder - 3:40

11. Slow Down Town - 5:26

12. All of Your Lies (Digital Bonus Track) - 4:02

13. Skeleton Man (Digital Bonus Track) - 4:29

References

(1) http://www.polyvinylrecords.com/store/index.php?id=900

Headlights (band) albums